Passion Like Fire is the seventh studio album by Canadian singer Tamia. It was released on September 7, 2018 through Plus One Music Group and 21 Entertainment. Her first project to be distributed by eOne Music, its release marked twenty years since the release of her solo debut single "Imagination" and its eponymous parent album. A breakaway from her previous album Love Life (2015), the singer worked with a smaller team of collaborators on the album, involving longtime contributors Shep Crawford and Salaam Remi as well as songwriters Lundon Knighten and Jonas Myrin and chief producer Lil' Ronnie and his team.

The album debuted at number 145 on the US Billboard 200, becoming her lowest-charting album yet, while reaching number 17 on Top R&B Albums chart. Its release was preceded by the singles "Leave It Smokin'" and "Today I Do", the former of which became her biggest hit in years, peaking at number two on Billboards Adult R&B Songs. A third single, "It's Yours", reached the top ten on the same chart. In support of the album, Tamia embarked on the Passion Like Fire Tour which launched on September 18, 2018 and visited most of the major US cities as well as several international venues.

Background
In 2015, Tamia signed a recording deal with Def Jam Recordings. Her contract marked her return to the major label rank after a decade of independent studio releases through her own label Plus One Music Group. Love Life, her first album with the Def Jam, saw Tamia consulting a diverse roster of collaborators, including production credits from Pop & Oak, The-Dream, Tricky Stewart, and Polow da Don as well as frequent collaborators The Stereotypes and Shep Crawford. Upon release, the critical response to album was highly positive. It debuted at number 24 on the US Billboard 200, selling 16,000 copies in its first week. It also topped the Top R&B Albums chart and reached number two on the Top R&B/Hip-Hop Albums, becoming Tamia's highest-charting album ever on both charts.

Following the termination of her one-record deal with Def Jam, Tamia began work her on her seventh album Passion Like Fire independently again under eOne Music and 21 Entertainment Group. In contrast to Love Life, she recruited a smaller team of collaborators for the album, including producer Lil' Ronnie who would contribute one half to the album's final track listing, leading to his executive producer status on the album. Tamia also reteamed with Salaam Remi, and Shep Crawford, and worked with duo Reyes Copello and Ryan Hawken on more songs. The album title Passion Like Fire borrows from the chorus lyrics of the album cut "Leave It Smokin'" in which she sings "I need passion like fire, leave it smokin'." When asked about what prompted her to name the album after that lyrics, Tamia remarked that it alludes to her longevity in music business about which she still feels passionate after twenty years.

Critical reception

Los Angeles Times writer Gerrick D. Kennedy found that Passion Like Fire "is more of the sultry, grown-up R&B-soul Tamia has delivered effortlessly for two decades now [...] Despite a current R&B landscape that favors experimentation and hip-hop edge, Hill has remained one of the few steadfast talents who rebukes trend-chasing, and her new album sees the singer playing directly to her strengths." SoulinStereo wrote that Passion Like Fire "feels like such a love letter to Tamia’s fans. From the power ballads to the sultry singles to the playful odes to love lost and found, it revisits many of the sounds that build her career. I really wish we had a couple of tracks as strong as the lead single to really set this album apart in Tamia’s renowned catalog."

In his review for Rolling Stone magazine, Elias Light rated Passion Like Fire three out of five stars. He felt that while Tamia's "voice is always resplendent", she "doesn't find enough sharp songs" to include on the album. Complimenting her collaborations with Salaam Remi and Shep Crawford, he criticized her decision to work with Lil' Ronnie on the majority of the album, commenting that "these two never gel". SoulTracks editor Charles Melody felt that the album was lackluster compared to her previous work on Love Life, but "still demonstrates the lyrical depth, vocal range and uniquely sweet, saucy that keeps her in demand and a part of the post-90's mix." He remarked thath Passion Like Fire comes across as sort of a misnomer. The dominance of ballads and scattering of midtempos make it less of a buoyant listen overall, although still a worthy one." Matt Collar of AllMusic found that the album "showcases the singer's sophisticated and mature R&B sound."

Commercial performance
In the United States, Passion Like Fire debuted at number 145 on the us Billboard 200 in the issue dated September 22, 2018, becoming Tamia's lowest debut as well as her first studio album to miss the upper half on the chart. It also reached number six on Billboards Independent Albums and number 20 on the Top Album Sales chart. Passion Like Fire also peaked at number 17 on the Top R&B Albums, marking her first project not to chart on the Top R&B/Hip-Hop Albums chart.

Track listing

Notes
 denotes co-producer

Personnel 
Performance credits

Daniel Bryant – instruments
Julio Reyes Copello – piano
Shep Crawford – instruments
The Experience Christian Ministries (ECM) Praise Team – background vocals
Grey Hawken – background vocals,  instruments
Phillip Lynah – guitar
Lil' Ronnie – instruments
Briana Martinez – background vocals
Jonas Myrin – background vocals

Clinton C. Peacock – piano
Natalia Ramirez – background vocals
Jack Rochon – guitar
Juan Camilo Sanchez – background vocals
Benjamin Singh-Reynolds – instruments
Shy Suber – guitar
Salaam Remi – instruments
Omar Walker – instruments
Jordan Welch – background vocals

Technical and production

Jason L. Blackerby – recording engineer
J. Bolin – creative director
Julio Reyes Copello – recording engineer
Kevin "KD" Davis – mixing
Nicolas de la Espriella – recording engineer
Chris Gehringer – mastering
Gray Hawken – recording engineer
Tamia Hill – executive producer

Phillip Lynah – recording engineer
Gary Noble – mixing
Marcus Owens – photography
Lil' Ronnie – executive producer
Salaam Remi – recording engineer
Phillip Scott III – recording engineer
Victoria Westfall – creative director

Charts

Release history

References

2018 albums
Tamia albums